Famous is the third studio album by American alternative rock band Puddle of Mudd. It was released on October 9, 2007 on Flawless Records. Famous was originally set to be released in May, but was pushed back to add more songs to the album.

The title track provided the album's lead single in May 2007. "Psycho", "We Don't Have to Look Back Now" and "Livin' on Borrowed Time" would follow in November, then May and August 2008. Famous debuted at number 27 on the U.S. Billboard 200, selling about 31,000 copies in its first week. The album had sold around 363,000 copies in the US by the time Puddle of Mudd released their next album, Volume 4: Songs in the Key of Love & Hate (2009).

History
After the previous album was released, guitarists Paul Phillips and drummer Greg Upchurch left the band, being replaced by Christian Stone and Ryan Yerdon respectively. The two moved on to play for Operator and 3 Doors Down, respectively.

In early 2007, the album was in finishing stages with producer Bill Stevenson. The band  had written 60 to 70 songs, eventually narrowing it down to just a few tracks. Originally, the album was due out in July with the title, Living on Borrowed Time.

The band employed a tactic common with Hip hop artists, having multiple producers on the album to match the feel of each song. After first working with Stevenson and Jason Livermore, the band decided to change directions on the recording style, with Scantlin stating "We did go to Colorado and worked with Jason and Bill on a full record’s worth of material... we decided to go over everything with a fine-toothed comb and make sure it was the record we truly wanted to put out. And we realized, ‘Hey, maybe we should hit up some more avenues rather than this punk direction.’”

The band hired Brian Howes, a writer-producer known for working with bands like Buckcherry and Hinder, to assist in writing and production, alongside several other producers including Jack Joseph Puig and Howard Benson. Bassist Douglas Ardito explained the writing process, stating "We had a lot of time to write and then make the record... This time we had time to live life and have experiences to talk about.” Scantlin explained "It’s about passion and writing music that connects with other people and somehow heals them.   really want to try to crawl under peoples’ skin and at the same time make some kick-ass rock ‘n roll music."

The album's title was changed to match that of its lead single by the label. Scantlin was unhappy with the results of the additional producers brought in, stating in a 2009 interview that the initial version "was fine" and expressing regrets about the final release.

Track listing

Personnel
Credits adapted from the album's liner notes.

Puddle of Mudd
Wesley Scantlin – Lead Vocals, Rhythm Guitar
Doug Ardito – Bass, vocals 
Christian Stone – Lead Guitar,  vocals 
Ryan Yerdon – Drums

Additional Personnel
Tony Fagenson – piano, guitars, keyboards, percussion, programming, backing vocals, engineering, production
Kenny Aranoff - drums
Josh Freese - drums
Xandy Barry - guitars
Duane Betts - guitars
Lenny Castro - percussion
Max Collins - acoustic guitar, production
Tony Battaglia - guitars, engineer, production
Andrew Berlin - guitars, engineer
Brian Howes - guitars, production
Christopher Jak - guitars, engineer
Abe Laboriel, Jr. - drums, percussion
Lee Miles - guitar, engineer
Tim Pierce - guitars
Mark Pontius - drums
Gabe Witcher - backing vocals

Production
Bryan Coisne - engineer
Paul DeCarli - digital editing
Kara DioGuardi - vocal production
Tal Herzberg – engineer
Hatsukazu Inagaki - engineer
Ted Jensen - mastering
Jolie Jones Levine - production coordinator
Jason Livermore - engineer, production
Jon Nicholson - drum tech
Mike Plotnikoff - engineer
Johnny Schou - engineer
Matt Serrecchio - engineer
Marc VanGool - guitar tech
Jack Joseph Puig – executive producer, mixing, production, A&R
Bill Stevenson – engineer, production
Jason VanPoederooyen - engineer

Charts

Weekly charts

Year-end charts

References

External links
Label website

2007 albums
Puddle of Mudd albums
Geffen Records albums
Albums produced by Bill Stevenson (musician)